Crystal healing is a pseudoscientific alternative-medicine practice that uses semiprecious stones and crystals such as quartz, agate, amethyst or opal. Adherents of the practice claim that these have healing powers, but there is no scientific basis for this claim. Practitioners of crystal healing believe they can boost low energy, prevent bad energy, release blocked energy, and transform a body's aura.

In one method, the practitioner places crystals on different parts of the body, often corresponding to chakras; or else the practitioner places crystals around the body in an attempt to construct an energy grid, which is purported to surround the client with healing energy. Scientific investigations have found no evidence that such "energy grids" actually exist, and there is no evidence that crystal healing has any greater effect upon the body than any other placebo.

Where the practice is popular, it fosters commercial demand for crystals, which can result in environmental damage and exploitative child labor to mine the crystals.

History

Origins
In Plato's account of Atlantis, crystal healing is also mentioned. According to Plato, the Atlanteans used crystals to read minds and transmit thoughts. The first historical documentation of crystals originated from the Ancient Sumerians (c. 4500 to c. 2000BC). The Sumerians used crystals in their magical formulas.

Ancient Egyptians mined for crystals and used them to make jewelry. Crystals or gemstones were also used in practice, for their metaphysical properties. Specifically, they used crystals as aids for health and protection. They often would bury a lapis lazuli scarab with their deceased, with the belief that it would protect them in the afterlife. Additionally, in Ancient Egypt amulets were used to ensure the well-being of the individual. The amulet's shape, decoration, inscription, color, material, or ritual performed with the amulet dictated its power. Amulets were worn or placed on the body, in the form of stones, piercings, rings, necklaces, or other jewelry. The Egyptians used amulets to benefit their afterlife, often representing an Egyptian deity and their specific powers. Amulets were also placed on mummies or in between the mummy's bandages, with funerary pieces usually being larger than those worn by the living. In funeral practices they also used headrest amulets, these were full-size headrests placed in tombs to protect the dead, they also symbolized the deceased rising and being revived, and the sun rising between two hills, which symbolized resurrection and rebirth.

The Ancient Greeks assigned a multitude of properties to crystals. The word 'crystal' is derived from the Greek word "krýstallos" which translates to "ice". The Ancient Greeks believed that clear quartz crystals were a water that had frozen to the point where it would remain in its solid form. The word "amethyst" in Ancient Greek language means "not intoxicate." Amethyst was worn as an amulet that they believed would aid hangovers or prevent intoxication.

Precious stones have been thought of as objects that can aid in healing—in a practice known as lapidary medicine—by a variety of cultures. The Hopi Native Americans of Arizona use quartz crystals to assist in diagnosing illnesses. Both Pliny the Elder and Galen claimed that certain crystals had medicinal properties. In Europe, the belief in the healing powers of crystals (and in particular crystal amulets) persisted into the Middle Ages. The alleged medicinal properties of precious stones, as well as other powers they were believed to hold, were collected in texts known as lapidaries, which remained popular in Medieval and Early Modern Europe until the 17th century.

Across cultures, different stones can symbolize or provide aide for different things. An example of this is rose quartz. In Egypt, it was believed rose quartz could prevent aging, but the Romans used rose quartz as a seal to signify ownership, while in the Middle Ages it was used in healing potions, today rose quartz is known as the "love stone" and is used to balance emotions, and heal anger and disappointment.

Contemporary use

New Age
In the English speaking world, crystal healing is heavily associated with the New Age spiritual movement: "the middle-class New Age healing activity par excellence". In contrast with other forms of complementary and alternative medicine (CAM), participants in crystal healing view the practice as "individuated", that is dependent on extreme personalization and creative expression. Practitioners of crystal healing purport that certain physical properties such as shape, color, and markings, determine the ailments that a stone can heal; lists of such links are published in commonly distributed texts. Paradoxically, practitioners also "hold the view that crystals have no intrinsic qualities but that, instead, their quality changes according to both" participants. After selecting the stones by color or their believed metaphysical qualities, they place them on parts of the body. Color selection and placement of stones are done according to concepts of grounding, chakras, or energy grids.

Sales and industry 
Worldwide, retail sales of crystals were estimated to amount to more than US$1 billion per year in 2019.

India, China, Brazil, and Madagascar are the main producers of crystals. In Madagascar, one of the sources of crystals, most crystals are mined in unsafe, non-industrial or "homemade" mines, with parents and children working together to dig crystals from pits and tunnels they dig with shovels. The miners are usually paid between 17 and 23 cents per kilogram for rose quartz (less than a penny per ounce). The miner's income may be just 0.1% of the final retail price. Some people in the industry say that the low pay for miners is because customers in developed countries want low retail prices; others say that it is due to shops in developed countries wanting to be more profitable.

Scientific evaluation
There is no peer-reviewed scientific evidence that crystal healing has any effect; it is considered a pseudoscience. Alleged successes of crystal healing can be attributed to the placebo effect. Furthermore, there is no scientific basis for the concepts of chakras, being "blocked", energy grids requiring grounding, or other such terms; they are widely understood to be nothing more than terms used by adherents to lend credibility to their practices. Energy, as a scientific term, is a very well-defined concept that is readily measurable and bears little resemblance to the esoteric concept of energy used by proponents of crystal healing.

In 1999, researchers French and Williams conducted a study to investigate the power of crystals compared with a placebo. Eighty volunteers were asked to meditate with either a quartz crystal, or a placebo stone which was indistinguishable from quartz. Many of the participants reported feeling typical "crystal effects"; however, this was irrespective of whether the crystals were real or placebo. In 2001 Christopher French, head of the anomalistic psychology research unit at the University of London and colleagues from Goldsmiths College outlined their study of crystal healing at the British Psychological Society Centenary Annual Conference, concluding: "There is no evidence that crystal healing works over and above a placebo effect."

Crystal healing effects could also be attributed to cognitive bias (which occurs when the believers want the practice to be true and see only things that back up that desire).

Crystal healing techniques are also practiced on animals, although some veterinary organizations, such as the British Veterinary Association, have warned that these methods are not scientifically proven and state that people should seek the advice of a vet before using alternative techniques.

Crystal healing proponents and 5G conspiracy theorists have falsely alleged the pseudoscientific and misinformational belief that shungite may absorb 5G radiation.

See also
Color healing
Energy medicine
Magnet therapy
List of topics characterized as pseudoscience

References

Further reading
Lawrence E. Jerome. (1989). Crystal Power: The Ultimate Placebo Effect. Prometheus Books.

External links
Crystal Healing: Stone-cold Facts About Gemstone Treatments – LiveScience
 Do You Know Where Your Healing Crystals Come From? at The New Republic
James Randi debunks Crystal Power

Energy therapies
Pseudoscience
Crystals
Supernatural healing
Gemstones in culture